Futura may refer to:

Businesses and organisations
 Futura International Airways, a former airline based in Spain
 Futura Gael, a former Irish subsidiary airline of Futura International Airways
 Tikal Futura, a shopping, business and hotel complex in Guatemala City, Guatemala
 Futura plus, a Serbian wholesale and retail company
 Futura, a now defunct British paperback publisher, part of Robert Maxwell's British Printing & Communications corporation.

Brands and marques
 Gibson Futura, an electric guitar
 Futura (typeface), a typeface designed in 1927 by Paul Renner
 Futura (cooker), a product of Hawkins Cookers Limited
 Royal Futura, a portable typewriter produced from 1958 to 1962
 Futura (clothing), a Dutch clothing brand.

Vehicles
 Aprilia Futura, a motorcycle
 Lincoln Futura, a Ford concept car
 Ford Futura, a car made by Ford Australia
 Suzuki Futura, a Suzuki Carry commercial vehicle made by Suzuki of Indonesia since 1991
 VDL Futura, a model of double decker and single decker coach models manufactured by VDL Bus and Coach

Books
 Futura (magazine), a monthly French comic book magazine in the 1970s
 Futura (science fiction magazine), published in Croatia 1992-2007

Film and TV
 Rai Futura, an Italian entertainment TV channel
 Futura (TV channel), Brazilian educational channel
 Futura, the name of the Maschinenmensch in the original script of the film Metropolis
 Futura, the home world of the eponymous hero in the television cartoon series Colonel Bleep.

Music and entertainment
 Futura Records, a French record company and Jazz label
 Radio Futura, a Spanish pop rock group
 La Futura, an album by the American rock band ZZ Top
Futura Free, a song by American alternative R&B singer Frank Ocean
Futura, an album by Bosnian rapper Jala Brat

Sport
 FC Futura, a football club from Finland
 Futura Cup, a hockey trophy of the Ligue Nord-Americaine de Hockey, Quebec

Other uses
 Futura (graffiti artist) (formerly known as Futura 2000), a graffiti artist
 Futura, a play written by Jordan Harrison and presented by the National Asian American Theater Company

See also
 Salix futura, a species of willow native to Japan
 Diva Futura, an Italian pornography and erotica film studio
 Diva Futura (album), an album by the Greek metal band Nightfall